The Western Norway region of Norway showed the highest population growth rate in Norway in 2010, at 1.44%. The fertility rate in this region is higher than in other parts of Norway. The population as of 1 January 2010 was 1,263,464, with 37.7% of the population living in Hordaland, 33.8% in Rogaland, 19.8% in Møre og Romsdal, and 8.4% in Sogn og Fjordane. 60% of the population is under 40 years old, and 30% is under 20 years old. Many of the historical immigrants in Western Norway came from countries like Scotland, England, Netherlands, Germany, Denmark and Sweden. Western Norway is the part of Norway which has the largest immigration from the western world.

The following demographic statistics are from the Statistics Norway, unless otherwise indicated.

Historical population

Age and sex distribution

Age structure

Norway
(2010 estimate) 
0–14 years: 18.9% (male 470,253; female 447,472) 
15–64 years: 66.2% (male 1,641,821; female 1,575,980) 
65 years and over: 14.9% (male 314,678; female 407,995)

Western Norway
(2010 estimate) 
0–14 years: 19.9% (male 128,405; female 123,094) 
15–64 years: 65.8% (male 429,302; female 401,410) 
65 years and over: 14.3% (male 79,008; female 102,245)

Population
 1,159,176 (1 January 2000)
 1,263,464 (1 January 2010)
 Population growth
 104,288 (8.9%)
 1,263,464 (1 January 2010)
 1,397,393 (1 January 2020)
 Population growth
 133,929 (10.6%)
 1,397,393 (1 January 2020)
 1,525,853 (1 January 2030)
 Population growth
 128,460 (9.1%)

Population comparative
Slightly larger than East Timor and Eswatini, but slightly smaller than Hawaii and Estonia.

Population growth rate
1.44% (in 2010)

Population growth rate comparative
Slightly larger than El Salvador and Iran, but slightly smaller than India.

Births and deaths

Life expectancy at birth
(2008) 
total population: 80.4 years 
male: 77.8 years 
female: 83.0 years

Total fertility rate
Western Norway has a higher fertility rate than Iran, Iceland, France and the United States, and it is the highest in Norway.

Language

Literacy
definition: age 15 and over can read and write 
total population: 100% 
male: NA% 
female: NA%

Immigration

Immigrants in Bergen and Stavanger

Religion

Christianity is the largest religion. 1,054,573 people are members of the Church of Norway. There is also 52,365 members in other Christian churches. Islam has 10,685 adherents in Western Norway, Buddhism has 2,082. 1,171 are of the Baháʼí Faith, Judaism, Sikhism and other religions.

There are more than thousand Protestant churches (in all municipalities), six Catholic churches (in Bergen, Stavanger, Haugesund, Ålesund, Molde and Kristiansund), two mosques (in Bergen and Stavanger), two Orthodox churches (in Bergen and Stavanger), and one Hindu temple (in Bergen).

The name "Bible Belt" has been applied historically to the Southern and Western parts of Norway. The region thus defined included most of Western Norway, especially Rogaland, Møre og Romsdal and some parts of Hordaland. Notably absent from this belt are bigger cities like Bergen and Stavanger where many people identify themselves as non-religious or with other religions. In these areas the conservative branch of the Church of Norway has a stronghold and the members usually associate themselves to Indremisjonen (Inner Mission). There are also numerous Pentecostals and members of the Free Churches, but these movements are also strongly represented in the rest of the country. The Bible Belt in Norway traditionally reflects the support for the Christian Democratic Party. However, especially since the first decade of the 21st century, conservative bible belt Christians unhappy with the more liberal development of the party have increasingly turned to the Progress Party.

Christianity
Christianity is the largest religious group. Although more and more ethnic Norwegians are less religious, Christian immigrants have increased the population. Many known Christian missionaries came from Western Norway, for example Torill Selsvold Nyborg, who is now the county mayor of Hordaland.

Protestantism

Protestantism is the majority religion in Norway. Most Norwegians are Lutheran and members of the Church of Norway. Over 85% of the population is member here. Every municipalities have Protestant churches. Many municipalities, for example Austevoll, a small municipality with around 4,000 inhabitants, have over 13 church buildings. Most Norwegians are not active in the church. Nevertheless, there are many who participate to worship at Christmas Eve. People outside the cities are often more religious than the population in the cities, although there are many religious Christians immigrants in the cities.

Catholicism
Catholicism increased its members in Western Norway due to immigration from Poland, the Philippines, Chile, and other Latin American and European countries. There are six Catholic churches (as of 2004), in Bergen (4,925 members), Stavanger (2,863 members), Haugesund (822 members), Ålesund (595 members), Molde (289) and Kristiansund (212). The largest church is St. Paul church in Bergen. The number of Catholics increased rapidly from 2005, because of immigration (mainly Polish). The capacity in the region is too small for all Catholics, and it is therefore planned to build several Catholic churches in the region, in addition to Orthodox churches.

Orthodoxy
There are only two Orthodox congregations in Western Norway, in Bergen and Stavanger. 368 people are members in Stavanger, but not all of them live in Rogaland. Congregations in some churches in Bergen have Orthodox worship in different languages. The numbers of Orthodox Christians in the region due to increased immigration from countries such as Russia and the rest of Eastern Europe.

Smaller denominations
9,803 people are Pentecostalists.
3,876 people are Jehovah's Witnesses, up from 3,872 in 2003.
3,692 people are Methodists.
1,949 people are Baptists, up from 1,880 in 2003.
1,314 people are members in the Norwegian Mission Association.
1,086 people are members in the Seventh-day Adventist Church.

Islam

While as many as 7.2% of Oslo's population are Muslims, this figure is only 0.85% in Western Norway. There are two mosques, one in Bergen and Stavanger. In total, 10,685 people members of this religious community.

Buddhism
Buddhism increased its number of adherents from 0 in 2004 to 2,082 in 2009.

Others

Judaism

Western Norway has a small Jewish community. There has never been a synagogue in this part of the country, but before World War II, there was one congregation in Bergen and one in Kristiansund.

See also

 List of regions of Norway

References

Demographics of Norway
Western Norway, Demographics